In mathematics, the free factor complex  (sometimes also called the complex of free factors) is a free group counterpart of the notion of the curve complex of a finite type surface.
The free factor complex was originally introduced in a 1998 paper of Allen Hatcher and Karen Vogtmann. Like the curve complex, the free factor complex is known to be Gromov-hyperbolic.

Formal definition

Let  be an integer and let  be the free group of rank .

In particular, a 1-cell is a collection  of two distinct 0-cells where  are proper free factors of  such that .

For  the above definition produces a complex with no -cells of dimension . Therefore,  is defined slightly differently. Two distinct 0-simplices  determine a 1-simplex in  if and only if there exists a free basis  of  such that .
The complex  has no -cells of dimension .

Main properties

 For every integer  the complex  is connected, locally infinite, and has dimension . The complex  is connected, locally infinite, and has dimension 1.
 For , the graph  is isomorphic to the Farey graph. 
For a k-simplex  and  one has .
For  the complex  has the homotopy type of a wedge of spheres of dimension .
For every integer , the free factor graph , equipped with the simplicial metric (where every edge has length 1), is a connected graph of infinite diameter.
For every integer , the free factor graph , equipped with the simplicial metric, is Gromov-hyperbolic. This result was originally established by Mladen Bestvina and Mark Feighn; see also  for subsequent alternative proofs.
An element  acts as a loxodromic isometry of  if and only if  is fully irreducible.
There exists a coarsely Lipschitz coarsely -equivariant coarsely surjective map , where  is the free splittings complex.  However, this map is not a quasi-isometry. The free splitting complex is also known to be Gromov-hyperbolic, as was proved by Handel and Mosher.  
Similarly, there exists a natural coarsely Lipschitz coarsely -equivariant coarsely surjective map , where  is the (volume-ones normalized) Culler–Vogtmann Outer space, equipped with the symmetric Lipschitz metric.
The hyperbolic boundary  of the free factor graph can be identified with the set of equivalence classes of "arational" -trees in the boundary  of the Outer space .

Other models

These models include:

References

See also
Mapping class group

Geometric group theory
Geometric topology